The Soldier is the second album led by American jazz drummer Billy Higgins recorded in 1979 and released on the Dutch Timeless label. Digitally remastered in 2015 the album was reissued on the Japanese label Solid Records in their Timeless Jazz Master Collection.

Reception
The AllMusic review by Michael G. Nastos states "This recording with Cedar Walton (p) presents post-bop standards, well-played".

Track listing
 "Sugar and Spice" (Monty Waters) – 4:50
 "Midnite Waltz" (Cedar Walton) – 9:47
 "Just in Time" (Jule Styne, Betty Comden, Adolph Green) – 5:45
 "If You Could See Me Now" (Tadd Dameron, Carl Sigman) – 7:20
 "Peace" (Horace Silver) – 5:17
 "Sonny Moon for Two" (Sonny Rollins) – 6:43

Personnel
Billy Higgins – drums
Monty Waters – alto saxophone
Cedar Walton – piano
Walter Booker – bass
Roberta Davis – vocals (on "Sugar and Spice")

References 

Timeless Records albums
Billy Higgins albums
1981 albums